Zardoni (also, Zardonu) is a village in the Lerik Rayon of Azerbaijan.  The village forms part of the municipality of Tikəbənd.

References 

Populated places in Lerik District